Filip Martijn van As (born 1966 in Den Helder) is a Dutch politician, on behalf of the party the ChristianUnion (ChristenUnie) and previously for the Reformatory Political Federation (Reformatorische Politieke Federatie). He was in local governments in Leiden and Dronten, and currently is in Zwolle.

References

1966 births
Living people
Aldermen in Flevoland
People from Dronten
Aldermen in Overijssel
People from Zwolle
Christian Union (Netherlands) politicians
21st-century Dutch politicians
Municipal councillors of Leiden
Aldermen of Leiden
Netherlands Reformed Churches Christians from the Netherlands
People from Den Helder
Reformatory Political Federation politicians